Crushed red pepper or red pepper flakes is a condiment or spice consisting of dried and crushed (as opposed to ground) red chili peppers. This condiment is most often produced from cayenne-type peppers, although commercial producers may use a variety of different cultivars, usually within the 30,000–50,000 Scoville unit range. Often there is a high ratio of seeds, which are erroneously believed to contain the most heat. Crushed red pepper is used by food manufacturers in pickling blends, chowders, spaghetti sauce, pizza sauce, soups and sausage.

Crushed red pepper in Turkey, served as a common condiment with very few seeds, is known as pul biber.  One specially prepared variety of it is the urfa pul biber  (isot).

Background 
Crushed red pepper, known for its spicy heat, comes with a range of capsicum peppers. One or multiple red chile peppers—up to four cultivars—can be used to create crushed red pepper. Jalapeños, serranos and Anaheim chilis are some of the most commonly used chilies to make crushed red pepper. Crushed red pepper are frequently found in a variety of dishes including Italian, Indian, Mexican and Caribbean.

Over time, crushed red pepper loses its spiciness level and typically lasts up to 12 to 18 months. Today, China and Turkey are among the top countries to produce crushed red pepper.

History 
Red chili peppers, which are a part of the Solanaceae (nightshade) family, were first found in Central and South America and have been harvested for use since about 7,500 BC. Spanish explorers were introduced to the pepper while on a search for black pepper. Once brought back to Europe, the red peppers were traded in Asian countries and enjoyed primarily by Indian cooks. The village of Bukovo, North Macedonia, is often credited with the creation of crushed red pepper. The name of the village—or a derivative of it—is now used as a name for crushed red pepper in general in many Southeast European languages: "буковска пипер/буковец" (bukovska piper/bukovec, Macedonian), "bukovka" (Serbo-Croatian and Slovene) and "μπούκοβο" (boukovo, búkovo, Greek).

Southern Italians popularized crushed red pepper beginning in the 19th century and heavily used them in the U.S. when they migrated over. Crushed red pepper was served with dishes at some of the oldest Italian restaurants in the U.S. Crushed red pepper shakers have become a standard on tables at Mediterranean restaurants—and especially pizza parlors—around the world.

Health benefits 
The source of bright red color that the peppers hold comes from carotenoids. Crushed red pepper also has antioxidants that are thought to help fight off heart disease and cancer. In addition, crushed red pepper contains fiber, capsaicin—the source of the heat in pepper chilis—and vitamins A, C, and B6. Capsaicin is believed to help kill off prostate cancer cells, to serve as an appetite suppressant which can contribute to weight loss, to improve digestion, and to help prevent diabetes and constipation.

References

Condiments
Chili peppers